Robert Ian Perina (January 16, 1921 – August 2, 1991) was an American football running back, quarterback and defensive back in the National Football League. He played for the New York Yankees, Brooklyn Dodgers, Chicago Rockets, Chicago Bears and Baltimore Colts. He played college football for the Princeton Tigers.

References

1921 births
1981 deaths
American football running backs
American football quarterbacks
American football defensive backs
New York Yankees (NFL) players
Brooklyn Dodgers (NFL) players
Chicago Rockets players
Chicago Bears players
Baltimore Colts players
Princeton Tigers football players
People from Irvington, New Jersey
Baltimore Colts (1947–1950) players